Mariastern Abbey is a Cistercian nunnery in Hohenweiler, Austria. It is the mother house of Marienfeld Abbey, founded in 1974.

Cistercian nunneries in Austria
Buildings and structures in Vorarlberg